The 2013 Tour de France was the 100th edition of the Tour de France, one of cycling's Grand Tours. It started on the island of Corsica on 30 June and finished on the Champs-Élysées in Paris on 21 July. Second and third respectively were Nairo Quintana and the  rider Joaquim Rodríguez.

Marcel Kittel was the first rider to wear the general classification leader's yellow jersey after winning stage one. Simon Gerrans gained the race lead after his team, won the stage four team time trial. Gerrans passed the lead on to teammate Daryl Impey after the fifth stage. Froome took the lead from Impey after a dominant performance in the eighth stage, the first classified as mountainous. Froome maintained his lead for the remainder of the race by consolidating his lead through solid performances in the individual time trials and another dominant win on Mont Ventoux, while defending his GC lead in the mountains of the final week from his nearest challenger, the white jersey and eventual King of the mountains, Nairo Quintana.

Froome became the second consecutive British cyclist to win the Tour de France, after Bradley Wiggins accomplished the feat the year before. In the race's other classifications,  rider Quintana took the mountains classification with a summit victory in the final mountain stage edging out Froome, and also finished as the best young rider in the general classification, finishing in second place overall; Peter Sagan of the  team was the winner of the points classification, with  finishing as the winners of the team classification. Christophe Riblon was given the award for the most combative rider. Kittel won the most stages, with four.

Teams

Twenty-two teams participated in the 2013 edition of the Tour de France. The race was the 18th of the 29 events in the UCI World Tour, and all of its nineteen UCI ProTeams were entitled, and obliged, to enter the race. On 27 April 2013, the organiser of the Tour, Amaury Sport Organisation (ASO), announced the three second-tier UCI Professional Continental teams given wildcard invitations, all of which were French-based. The presentation of the teams took place at the harbour of Porto-Vecchio on the island of Corsica on 27 June, two days before the opening stage held in the town. Each team arrived by boat to the stage, before being introduced to the crowd.

Each squad was allowed a maximum of nine riders, therefore the start list contained a total of 198 riders. Of these, 54 were riding the Tour de France for the first time. The riders came from 34 countries; France, Spain, Italy, Netherlands, Australia, Belgium and Germany all had 10 or more riders in the race. Riders from ten countries won stages during the race; German riders won the largest number of stages, with six. The average age of riders in the race was 29.45 years, ranging from the 19-year-old Danny van Poppel to the 41-year-old Jens Voigt. Of the total average ages,  was the youngest team and  the oldest.

The teams entering the race were:

UCI ProTeams

 
 
 
 
 
 
 
 
 
 
 
 
 
 
 
 
 
 
 

UCI Professional Continental teams

Pre-race favourites

In the run up to the 2013 Tour de France, Chris Froome was widely considered as the top pre-race favourite for the general classification, with his closest rivals thought to be Alberto Contador and Joaquim Rodríguez. 's Vincenzo Nibali was also a possible contender after getting his first Tour podium in 2012 but he had focused on the 2013 Giro d'Italia. The other riders considered contenders for the general classification were  riders Cadel Evans and Tejay van Garderen, Richie Porte, Jurgen Van den Broeck, Thibaut Pinot, Ryder Hesjedal, Robert Gesink, and  riders Alejandro Valverde and Nairo Quintana.

He had shown his form so far in 2013 season by winning four of the five stage races he had ridden: Tour of Oman, Critérium International, Tour de Romandie and Critérium du Dauphiné. Two-time Tour winner (2007 and 2009) Contador returned to the race having been suspended from the 2012 race; he had won the 2012 Vuelta a España and his best major result of the season was second in Oman. Rodríguez had podium finishes in both the Giro and Vuelta in 2012, as well as winning the UCI World Tour. He had top-ten placings in three major stage races in the season.

The sprinters considered favourites for the points classification and wins in bunch sprint finishes were Mark Cavendish, Peter Sagan, André Greipel, Matthew Goss and  riders Marcel Kittel and John Degenkolb. Cavendish won the points classification at the 2013 Giro and had shown his form with thirteen wins in the season. In the previous year's Tour, Sagan won the points classification and had won the same at the Tour de Suisse in the month preceding the Tour. Greipel, whose team manager Marc Sergeant claimed he had the best sprint train, came into the Tour with nine wins in the season, including three at the Tour Down Under. Goss only had one victory in the season, but had a team of strong and experienced riders. Kittel, as with Greipel, would arrive with a team dedicated for the sprints and he had accumulated eleven wins in the season. His teammate Degenkolb won five stages at the 2012 Vuelta and it was thought he was most likely to be used for the hillier stages.

Route and stages

On 24 November 2011, the ASO announced Corsica would host the 2013 edition's opening stages (known as the Grand Départ), the first time the Tour has visited the island. The route of the race was unveiled on 24 October 2012 at the Palais des Congrès in Paris. The Tour was the first to be completed entirely on French soil since 2003 and included ten new start or finish locations. The Grand Départ in Corsica consisted of three stages. The ASO chartered the Mega Smeralda cruiseferry in Porto-Vecchio to house members of the organisation, media and others who work on the Tour and to host press conferences. It featured a final set of stages which were described by journalist William Fotheringham as "brutal", including three Alpine stages in the last week along with a "viciously hard" time trial. As the 100th edition of the race, the race featured some of the famous climbs from the history of the race, Mont Ventoux and Alpe d'Huez, which was climbed twice in a stage for the first time.

The opening stage left Porto-Vecchio and ended in Bastia, with next two stages ending in Ajaccio and Calvi respectively. The race then moved to mainland France at Nice. Stages five to eight formed a four-stage journey that navigated westwards finishing at the Ax 3 Domaines ski resort in the Pyrenees. Stage nine took place between Saint-Girons to Bagnères-de-Bigorre, before a long transfer moved the race to the north-west of the country. Stage ten finished in the port city of Saint-Malo, with the next finishing at the Mont Saint-Michel island commune in Normandy. The following four stages, 11 to 15, crossed the centre of the country back to the south-east finishing atop Mont Ventoux. The next five stages took place in and around the Alps, before a second long transfer took the Tour to the finish with the Champs-Élysées stage in Paris.

Eight stages were officially classified as flat, three medium mountain, seven high mountain, two individual time trial and one team time trial. There were four summit finishes: stage 8, to Ax 3 Domaines; stage 15, to Mont Ventoux; stage 18, to Alpe d'Huez; and stage 20, to Semnoz; The highest point of elevation in the race was the -high Port de Pailhères mountain pass on stage eight. It was among seven hors catégorie (English: beyond category) rated climbs in the race. The final stage ending on the Champs-Élysées was an evening finish for the first time. There were ten new stage start or finish locations. The rest days were after stage 9, in Saint-Nazaire, and 15, in Vaucluse.

Race overview

Opening week and Pyrenees

As the peloton closed in, the bus was freed, and the decision was reversed. Marcel Kittel took the victory from the bunch sprint, putting him in the race leader's yellow jersey; he also became the first leader of the points classification, with Juan José Lobato taking the polka dot jersey as the leader of the mountains classification. Two crashes occurred in the stage; the first with  remaining and the second in the final kilometers, which included a contender for the stage, Mark Cavendish. The second stage 's Jan Bakelants launched an attack from a breakaway group in the final kilometer to win in Ajaccio, one second ahead of the encroaching peloton. The yellow jersey switched to Bakelants, and Pierre Rolland of  claimed the polka dot. Simon Gerrans won the third stage, the final in Corsica, from a bunch sprint in Calvi. Peter Sagan took over the points classification.  won stage four's  team time trial in and around Nice, putting Gerrans in the yellow jersey.  came in second place, one second in arrears, with  a further two.

The fifth and sixth stages ended in bunch sprints, with Cavendish and André Greipel the victors respectively. After stage six, Daryl Impey became the first South African rider to wear the yellow jersey. His teammate Gerrans ensured it for him by holding back at the finish allowing Impey – who was second overall – the time necessary to replace him at the top of the general classification. Sagan claimed the seventh stage from a bunch sprint in Albi, with  rider Blel Kadri talking the polka dot jersey. In stage eight, the Tour's first mountain stage, which ended at the Ax 3 Domaines, Froome attacked a select five-rider group, which included Alberto Contador and Alejandro Valverde, as they passed the lone leader Nairo Quintana with  remaining. Froome took the stage win, fifty-one seconds ahead of his teammate Richie Porte, with Valverde third a further seventeen down. Contador and Quintana finished one minute forty-five seconds behind Froome. Froome's victory win put him in the lead of the general and mountains classifications, ahead of Porte. In the ninth stage, Froome managed to subdue attacks from his rivals, although his team's efforts left him isolated for the majority of the stage. After a descent from the mountain pass of La Hourquette d'Ancizan, a group of twenty-three riders came into the finish in Bagnères-de-Bigorre, where Dan Martin beat Jakob Fuglsang from sprint, twenty seconds ahead of the group. Porte lost eighteen minutes, dropping from second overall to thirty-third, with Valverde moving up to second. Rolland took back the polka dot jersey. The next day was the first rest day of the Tour.

North-west and journey south

Kittel took his second stage of the Tour win from the bunch sprint in the tenth stage, with his compatriot Greipel second. Stage eleven's individual time trial between Avranches and Mont Saint-Michel was taken by 's Tony Martin. Froome came second with a deficit of twelve seconds, over two minutes ahead of the second placed overall Valverde, extending his lead to over three minutes. Two flat stages ending with bunch sprints then followed; the first, stage twelve, was won by Kittel, ahead of Cavendish, who came back to win the next. The stage saw Valverde suffer a punctured tyre and lose almost ten minutes, struggling to match the pace set by Cavendish's  team at the head of the race. Stage fourteen was taken by 's Matteo Trentin from a large breakaway that held off the peloton.

Stage fifteen, finishing on Mont Ventoux, saw all of the leading contenders, with exception of Froome and Contador, dropped on the early part of the final climb. Froome then moved away from Contador and caught Quintana, who had attacked earlier in the climb. The pair worked together to put time into their rivals, before Froome attacked with  remaining and soloed to the finish. This gave Froome a lead of four minutes and fourteen seconds over Mollema in second place, with Contador a further eleven seconds back. Froome regained the lead in the mountains classification. The following day was the Tour's second rest day.

Alps and finale
The sixteenth stage saw a twenty-six rider breakaway reach the final climb, the Col de Manse, where Rui Costa attacked and then descended on his own to the finish in Gap. Froome won stage seventeen's time trial, finishing the  course from Embrun to Chorges in 51 minutes and 33 seconds, with Contador coming in nine seconds behind, in second place. Contador moved up to second overall, four minutes and thirty-four seconds down, with teammate Roman Kreuziger third. In the Tour's queen stage, the eighteenth, early breakaway riders Christophe Riblon and Tejay van Garderen led on the second ascent of Alpe d'Huez. Van Garderen attacked on the early slopes, opening up a margin of forty-five seconds on Riblon in the second part of the climb, before Riblon passed with  remaining and took the stage win by fifty-nine seconds. Quintana and Rodríguez came in fourth and fifth respectively, over two minutes in arrears. With  to go, Porte and Froome, who came in under minute after the aforementioned pair, were penalised twenty seconds as Porte went back to the team car to retrieved an energy gel and water bottle for Froome outside the designated zone. Froome extended his lead over Contador by thirty-seven seconds.

Costa repeated his feat of three stages previous by taking victory in stage nineteen, by attacking on the final climb of Col de la Croix Fry and soloing to the finish in Le Grand-Bornand. There were no major changes at the head of general classification. Stage twenty, the penultimate stage, saw the leaders of the general classification still together at the head of the race with  remaining of the final climb of Mont Semnoz. Quintana and Rodríguez then attacked, with Froome the only rider able to bridge, and again the pair pulling away, with Quintana managing to hold off Rodríguez by eighteen seconds to take the stage win, with Froome a further eleven down. Contador came in seventh, two minutes and twenty-eight in arrears, dropping to fourth overall, with Rodríguez moving up to third. With the double points gained with his win Quintana secured the mountains classification.

The final stage was won by Kittel on the Champs-Élysées, his fourth stage win of the race. Froome finished the race to claim his first Tour de France, becoming the second British rider to win the race. He beat second-placed Quintana by four minutes and twenty seconds, with Rodríguez third, a further forty-four seconds down. Sagan won his second consecutive points classification with a total of 409, 100 ahead of Cavendish in second. Froome placed second behind Quintana in the mountains classification, with Rolland third. The best young rider was Quintana, followed by Andrew Talansky and Michał Kwiatkowski respectively.  finished as the winners of the team classification, eight minutes and twenty-eight seconds ahead of second-placed . Of the 198 starters, 169 reached the finish of the last stage in Paris.

Classification leadership and minor prizes

There were four main individual classifications contested in the 2013 Tour de France, as well as a team competition. The most important was the general classification, which was calculated by adding each rider's finishing times on each stage. There were no time bonuses given at the end of stages for this edition of the Tour. If a crash had happened within the final  of a stage, not including time trials and summit finishes, the riders involved would have received the same time as the group they were in when the crash occurred. The rider with the lowest cumulative time was the winner of the general classification and was considered the overall winner of the Tour. The rider leading the classification wore a yellow jersey.

The second classification was the points classification. Riders received points for finishing among the highest placed in a stage finish, or in intermediate sprints during the stage. The points available for each stage finish were determined by the stage's type. No points were awarded for the team time trial on stage four. The leader was identified by a green jersey.

The third classification was the mountains classification. Points were awarded to the riders that reached the summit of the most difficult climbs first. The climbs were categorised as fourth-, third-, second-, first-category and hors catégorie], with the more difficult climbs rated lower. Double points were awarded on the summit finishes on stages 5, 15, 18 and 20. The leader wore a white jersey with red polka dots.

The final individual classification was the young rider classification. This was calculated the same way as the general classification, but the classification was restricted to riders who were born on or after 1 January 1988. The leader wore a white jersey.

The final classification was a team classification. This was calculated using the finishing times of the best three riders per team on each stage, excluding the team time trial; the leading team was the team with the lowest cumulative time. The number of stage victories and placings per team determined the outcome of a tie. The riders in the team that lead this classification were identified with yellow number bibs on the back of their jerseys and yellow helmets.

In addition, there was a combativity award given after each stage to the rider considered, by a jury, to have "made the greatest effort and who has demonstrated the best qualities of sportsmanship". No combativity awards were given for the time trials and the final stage. The winner wore a red number bib the following stage. At the conclusion of the Tour, Christophe Riblon won the overall super-combativity award, again, decided by a jury.

A total of €2,023,300 was awarded in cash prizes in the race. The overall winner of the general classification received €450,000, with the second and third placed riders got €200,000 and €100,000 respectively. All finishers of the race were awarded with money. The holders of the classifications benefited on each stage they led; the final winners of the points and mountains were given €25,000, while the best young rider and most combative rider got €20,000. Team prizes were available, with €10,000 for the winner of team time trial and €50,000 for the winners of the team classification. There was also a special award with a prize of €5,000, the Souvenir Henri Desgrange, given in honour of Tour founder Henri Desgrange to first rider to pass the summit of the highest climb in the Tour, the Port de Pailhères. This prize was won by Nairo Quintana on stage eight.

 In stage two, Alexander Kristoff, who was second in the points classification, wore the green jersey, because Marcel Kittel wore the yellow jersey as leader of the general classification during that stage. Additionally, Danny van Poppel, who was second in the young rider classification, wore the white jersey, because Marcel Kittel wore the yellow jersey as leader of the general classification during that stage.
 In stage nine, Pierre Rolland, who was second in the mountains classification, wore the polka dot jersey, because Chris Froome wore the yellow jersey as leader of the general classification during that stage. Froome and Rolland both had collected 31 points up to this point, but Froome claimed the polka dot jersey, because he had crossed the line as first on first category mountains more often than Rolland.
Mark Cavendish was then selected to represent the team on the podium.
 In stages sixteen to eighteen, Mikel Nieve, who was third in the mountains classification, wore the polka dot jersey, because Chris Froome wore the yellow jersey as leader of the general classification during those stages, and Nairo Quintana wore the white jersey as leader of the young rider classification during the same stages.
 In stage nineteen, Christophe Riblon who was third in the mountains classification, wore the polka dot jersey, because Chris Froome wore the yellow jersey as leader of the general classification during those stages, and Nairo Quintana wore the white jersey as leader of the young rider classification during the same stages.
 In stage twenty, Pierre Rolland, who was second in the mountains classification, wore the polka dot jersey, because Chris Froome wore the yellow jersey as leader of the general classification during that stage.
 In stage twenty-one, Andrew Talansky, who was second in the young rider classification, wore the white jersey, because Nairo Quintana wore the polka dot jersey as leader of the mountains classification.

Final standings

General classification

Points classification

Mountains classification

Young rider classification

Team classification

UCI World Tour rankings

Riders from the ProTeams competing individually, as well as for their teams and nations, for points that contributed towards the World Tour rankings. Points were awarded to the top twenty finishers in the general classification and to the top five finishers in each stage. The 587 points accrued by Chris Froome put him in to the lead of the individual ranking, with Peter Sagan dropping to second.  retained their lead of the team ranking, ahead of second-placed . Spain remained as leaders of the nation ranking, with Great Britain second.

See also

 2013 in men's road cycling
 2013 in sports

References

Bibliography

Further reading

External links

 

 
2013
2013 UCI World Tour
2013 in French sport
Sport in Corsica
June 2013 sports events in France
July 2013 sports events in France